A list of notable artists who specialise in art of the female form:

A–K
Gerald Brom – fantasy art
Lewis Carroll – fine art
Frank Cho – fantasy and comic art
Pino Daeni
Sir William Russell Flint – classical art
Carole Feuerman – hyperrealism
Frank Frazetta  – fantasy art
Frederick Carl Frieseke – American impressionist
Lucian Freud - figurative
Maggi Hambling - sculptures, Mary Wollstonecraft
Chantal Joffe - depictions of women and children
Gustav Klimt
Olivia de Berardinis – modern day and pin up
Orlan - contemporary and body modification

L–Q
David LaChappelle - photographer
Maria Lassnig - self portraits and paintings focused on body awareness
Aristide Maillol – early 20th century
Milo Manara – Italian comic book writer and artist
Alfons Mucha – art nouveau
Patrick Nagel – modern day
Alice Neel - depicts women through the female gaze
Michael Parkes – modern day
George Petty – pin up art

R–V
Luis Royo – fantasy art
Jenny Saville - contemporary
Suzanne Valadon - post-impressionism 
Boris Vallejo – fantasy art
Alberto Vargas – pin up art

W–Z
J W Waterhouse – classical art
Dean Yeagle – comic art

References

Female form
Pin-up art
Women-related lists